The Pedestrian is a side scrolling puzzle-platform game developed and published by American studio Skookum Arts LLC. The game was originally released in January 2020 for Linux, MacOS and Microsoft Windows. In August 2020, a port for PlayStation 4 and PlayStation 5 was announced for January 2021, during a State of Play presentation. It later released for Xbox One and Xbox Series X/S in January 2022. It is also planned to release for the Nintendo Switch at a later date.

Gameplay
The game is played on 2D signs that can be externally altered to change the play space. This is the main mechanic in puzzle-solving. As the game progresses, more mechanics are added both in and around the signs.

Development
Development took longer than expected. After being unready to release the game even after delaying the release date, the developers changed the listed release date to "When it's finished."

Reception

Metacritic rated this game 81/100, indicating "generally favorable" reviews.

References

External links
 

2020 video games
PlayStation 4 games
PlayStation 5 games
Linux games
MacOS games
Windows games
Nintendo Switch games
Xbox One games
Xbox Series X and Series S games
Puzzle-platform games
Indie video games
Side-scrolling platform games
Video games developed in the United States
Video games set in New York City
Single-player video games
Video games with 2.5D graphics